Old East Slavic (traditionally also Old Russian; ;) was a language used during the 5th–16th centuries (alternatively, from the 7th or 8th century to the 13th or 14th century) by the East Slavs from which the Belarusian, Russian, Rusyn, and Ukrainian languages later evolved.

Terminology 
The name of the language is known as Old East Slavic, in reference to the modern family of East Slavic languages. Its original speakers were the Slavic tribes inhabiting territories of today's Belarus, the western edge of Russia, and western and central Ukraine. However, the term Old East Slavic is not universally applied. The language is traditionally also known as Old Russian,, however the term has been described as a misnomer, because the initial stages of the language which it denotes predate the dialectal divisions marking the nascent distinction between modern East Slavic languages (Belarusian, Russian, and Ukrainian). Old East Slavic is therefore the more appropriate term.

Some scholars have also called the language Rus'ian, Rusian, or Rus' language, although these are less commonly used forms. In the last four decades, Kievan Rus' or Rus' have also replaced "Old Russia" (as well as "Kievan Russia" such as in George Vernadsky's books from 1943–69 "History of Russia") as the primary name for the lands in which Old East Slavic was spoken. According to historian Donald Ostrowski, this is not only more historically accurate, as "Rus'" was the name commonly used, it avoids giving priority to the Great Russian nationality, which projecting backwards would be highly anachronistic.

Ukrainian-American linguist George Shevelov used the term Common Russian or Common Eastern Slavic to refer to the hypothetical language of the East Slavs. In the context of the history of Ukrainian, however, he referred to historical phases of the language as Proto-Ukrainian and Old Ukrainian, using criteria based on the available sources: the PU period (up to the mid 11th century) having no sources written down by speakers in Ukraine, and the OU period (from the mid 11th to the 14th century) represented by texts chiefly compiled in Church Slavonic but preserving evidence of Old East Slavic in Ukraine. The periodization of the literary language represents great changes and breaks resulting from events in cultural and political history; in contrast, the spoken language of Ukraine "shows a surprising continuity in development from prehistoric times to our day."

American Slavist Alexander M. Schenker pointed out that modern terms for the medieval language of the East Slavs varied depending on the political context. He suggested using the neutral term East Slavic for that language.

General considerations

The language was a descendant of the Proto-Slavic language and retained many of its features. It developed so-called pleophony (or polnoglasie 'full vocalisation'), which came to differentiate the newly evolving East Slavic from other Slavic dialects. For instance, Common Slavic  'settlement, town' was reflected as OESl. gorodъ, Common Slavic  'milk' > OESl. moloko, and Common Slavic  'cow' > OESl korova. Other Slavic dialects differed by resolving the closed-syllable clusters *eRC and *aRC as liquid metathesis (South Slavic and West Slavic), or by no change at all (see the article on Slavic liquid metathesis and pleophony for a detailed account).

Since extant written records of the language are sparse, it is difficult to assess the level of its unity. In consideration of the number of tribes and clans that constituted Kievan Rus, it is probable that there were many dialects of Old East Slavonic. Therefore, today we may speak definitively only of the languages of surviving manuscripts, which, according to some interpretations, show regional divergence from the beginning of the historical records. By c. 1150 it had the weakest local variations among the four regional macrodialects of Common Slavic, c. 800–c. 1000, which had just begun to differentiate into its branches.

With time, it evolved into several more diversified forms, which were the predecessors of the modern Belarusian, Russian, Rusyn and Ukrainian languages. The regional languages were distinguishable starting in the 12th or 13th century. Thus different variations evolved of the Russian language in the regions of Novgorod, Moscow, South Russia  and meanwhile the Ukrainian language was also formed. Each of these languages preserves much of the Old East Slavic grammar and vocabulary. The Russian language in particular borrows more words from Church Slavonic than does Ukrainian.

However, findings by Russian linguist Andrey Zaliznyak suggest that, until the 14th or 15th century, major language differences were not between the regions occupied by modern Belarus, Russia and Ukraine, but rather between the north-west (around modern Velikiy Novgorod and Pskov) and the center (around modern Kyiv, Suzdal, Rostov, Moscow as well as Belarus) of the East Slavic territories. Old Novgorodian dialect of that time differed from the central East Slavic dialects as well as from all other Slavic languages much more than in later centuries. According to Zaliznyak, the Russian language developed as a convergence of that dialect and the central ones, whereas Ukrainian and Belorusian were continuation of development of the central dialects of the East Slavs.

Also, Russian linguist Sergey Nikolaev, analysing historical development of Slavic dialects’ accent system, concluded that a number of other tribes in Kievan Rus came from different Slavic branches and spoke distant Slavic dialects.

Another Russian linguist G. A. Khaburgaev as well as a number of Ukrainian linguists (Stepan Smal-Stotsky, Ivan Ohienko, George Shevelov, Yevhen Tymchenko, Vsevolod Hantsov, Olena Kurylo) deny the existence of a common Old East Slavic language at any time in the past. According to them, the dialects of East Slavic tribes evolved gradually from the common Proto-Slavic language without any intermediate stages.

When after the end of the 'Tatar yoke' the territory of former Kievan Rus was divided between the Grand Duchy of Lithuania and the medieval Rus' principality Grand Principality of Moscow, two separate literary traditions emerged in these states, Ruthenian in the west and medieval Russian in the east.

Literary language of Rus' 

The political unification of the region into the state called Kievan Rus', from which modern Belarus, Russia and Ukraine trace their origins, occurred approximately a century before the adoption of Christianity in 988 and the establishment of the South Slavic Old Church Slavonic as the liturgical and literary language. Documentation of the Old East Slavic language of this period is scanty, making it difficult at best fully to determine the relationship between the literary language and its spoken dialects.

There are references in Byzantine sources to pre-Christian Slavs in European Russia using some form of writing. Despite some suggestive archaeological finds and a corroboration by the tenth-century monk Chernorizets Hrabar that ancient Slavs wrote in "strokes and incisions", the exact nature of this system is unknown.

Although the Glagolitic alphabet was briefly introduced, as witnessed by church inscriptions in Novgorod, it was soon entirely superseded by Cyrillic. The samples of birch-bark writing excavated in Novgorod have provided crucial information about the pure tenth-century vernacular in North-West Russia, almost entirely free of Church Slavonic influence. It is also known that borrowings and calques from Byzantine Greek began to enter the vernacular at this time, and that simultaneously the literary language in its turn began to be modified towards Eastern Slavic.

The following excerpts illustrate two of the most famous literary monuments.

NOTE: The spelling of the original excerpt has been partly modernized. The translations are best attempts at being literal, not literary.

Primary Chronicle 

, from the Laurentian Codex, 1377:

In this usage example of the language, the fall of the yers is in progress or arguably complete: several words end with a consonant, e.g. кнѧжит "to rule" < кънѧжити (modern Uk , R , B ). South Slavic features include времѧньнъıх "bygone" (modern R , Uk , B ). Correct use of perfect and aorist: єсть пошла "is/has come" (modern B , R , Uk ), нача "began" (modern Uk , B , R ) as a development of the old perfect. Note the style of punctuation.

Tale of Igor's Campaign 

Слово о пълку Игоревѣ. , from the Pskov manuscript, fifteenth cent.

Illustrates the sung epics, with typical use of metaphor and simile.

It has been suggested that the phrase растекаться мыслью по древу (to run in thought upon/over wood), which has become proverbial in modern Russian with the meaning "to speak ornately, at length, excessively," is a misreading of an original мысію (akin to  "mouse") from "run like a squirrel/mouse on a tree"; however, the reading мыслью is present in both the manuscript copy of 1790 and the first edition of 1800, and in all subsequent scholarly editions.

Old East Slavic literature 

The Old East Slavic language developed a certain literature of its own, though much of it (in hand with those of the Slavic languages that were, after all, written down) was influenced as regards style and vocabulary by religious texts written in Church Slavonic.  Surviving literary monuments include the legal code Justice of the Rus (Руська правда ), a corpus of hagiography and homily, the epic Song of Igor (Слово о полку игореве ) and the earliest surviving manuscript of the Primary Chronicle (Повесть временных лет ) – the Laurentian codex (Лаврентьевский список ) of 1377.

The earliest dated specimen of Old East Slavic (or, rather, of Church Slavonic with pronounced East Slavic interference) must be considered the written Sermon on Law and Grace(Slovo o zakone i blagodati), by Hilarion, metropolitan of Kiev. In this work there is a panegyric on Prince Vladimir of Kiev, the hero of so much of East Slavic popular poetry. It is rivalled by another panegyric on Vladimir, written a decade later by Yakov the Monk.

Other eleventh-century writers are Theodosius, a monk of the Kyiv Pechersk Lavra, who wrote on the Latin faith and some Pouchenia or Instructions, and Luka Zhidiata, bishop of Novgorod, who has left a curious Discourse to the Brethren. From the writings of Theodosius we see that many pagan habits were still in vogue among the people. He finds fault with them for allowing these to continue, and also for their drunkenness; nor do the monks escape his censures. Zhidiata writes in a more vernacular style than many of his contemporaries; he eschews the declamatory tone of the Byzantine authors. And here may be mentioned the many lives of the saints and the Fathers to be found in early East Slavic literature, starting with the two Lives of Sts Boris and Gleb, written in the late eleventh century and attributed to Jacob the Monk and to Nestor the Chronicler.

With the so-called Primary Chronicle, also attributed to Nestor, begins the long series of the Russian annalists. There is a regular catena of these chronicles, extending with only two breaks to the seventeenth century. Besides the work attributed to Nestor the Chronicler, there are the chronicles of Novgorod, Kiev, Volhynia and many others. Every town of any importance could boast of its annalists, Pskov and Suzdal among others.

In the twelfth century we have the sermons of bishop Cyril of Turov, which are attempts to imitate in Old East Slavic the florid Byzantine style. In his sermon on Holy Week, Christianity is represented under the form of spring, Paganism and Judaism under that of winter, and evil thoughts are spoken of as boisterous winds.

There are also the works of early travellers, as the igumen Daniel, who visited the Holy Land at the end of the eleventh and beginning of the twelfth century. A later traveller was Afanasiy Nikitin, a merchant of Tver, who visited India in 1470. He has left a record of his adventures, which has been translated into English and published for the Hakluyt Society.

A curious monument of old Slavonic times is the Pouchenie (Instruction), written by Vladimir Monomakh for the benefit of his sons. This composition is generally found inserted in the Chronicle of Nestor; it gives a fine picture of the daily life of a Slavonic prince. The Paterik of the Kievan Caves Monastery is a typical medieval collection of stories from the life of monks, featuring devils, angels, ghosts, and miraculous resurrections.

Lay of Igor's Campaign narrates the expedition of Igor Svyatoslavich, prince of Novhorod-Siverskyi against the Cumans. It is neither epic nor a poem but is written in rhythmic prose. An interesting aspect of the text is its mix of Christianity and ancient Slavic religion. Igor's wife Yaroslavna famously invokes natural forces from the walls of Putyvl. Christian motifs present along with depersonalised pagan gods in the form of artistic images. Another aspect, which sets the book apart from contemporary Western epics, are its numerous and vivid descriptions of nature, and the role which nature plays in human lives. Of the whole bulk of the Old East Slavic literature, the Lay is the only work familiar to every educated Russian or Ukrainian. Its brooding flow of images, murky metaphors, and ever changing rhythm have not been successfully rendered into English yet.  Indeed, the meanings of many words found in it have not been satisfactorily explained by scholars.

The Zadonshchina is a sort of prose poem much in the style of the Tale of Igor's Campaign, and the resemblance of the latter to this piece furnishes an additional proof of its genuineness. This account of the battle of Kulikovo, which was gained by Dmitri Donskoi over the Mongols in 1380, has come down in three important versions.

The early laws of Rus’ present many features of interest, such as the Russkaya Pravda of Yaroslav the Wise, which is preserved in the chronicle of Novgorod; the date is between 1018 and 1072.

Study 

The earliest attempts to compile a comprehensive lexicon of Old East Slavic were undertaken by Alexander Vostokov and Izmail Sreznevsky in the nineteenth century. Sreznevsky's Materials for the Dictionary of the Old Russian Language on the Basis of Written Records (1893–1903), though incomplete, remained a standard reference until the appearance of a 24-volume academic dictionary in 1975–99.

Notable texts 

 Bylinas
 The Tale of Igor's Campaign – the most outstanding literary work in this language 	
 Russkaya Pravda – an eleventh-century legal code issued by Yaroslav the Wise
 Praying of Daniel the Immured
 A Journey Beyond the Three Seas

See also
 Outline of Slavic history and culture
 List of Slavic studies journals
 History of the East Slavic languages
 List of Latvian words borrowed from Old East Slavic
 Old Russian literature

Notes

References

General references

Further reading

External links 
 Old Russian Online by Todd B. Krause and Jonathan Slocum, free online lessons at the Linguistics Research Center at the University of Texas at Austin
 Ostromir's Gospel Online
 Online library of the Old Russian texts 
 The Pushkin House, a great 12-volumed collection of ancient texts of the 11th–17th centuries with parallel Russian translations
 Izbornyk, library of Old East Slavic chronicles with Ukrainian and Russian translations

 
Belarusian language
Russian language
Ukrainian language